91.1 Energy FM (DXNW 91.1 MHz) is an FM station owned by Ultrasonic Broadcasting System and operated under a shared services agreement by NSR Broadcasting Promotion. Its studios and transmitter are located along Lapu-Lapu St., Digos.

References

External links
Energy FM Digos FB Page

Radio stations in Davao del Sur
Radio stations established in 2016